Thu Ha (born November 6, 1969 in Tuyen Quang) is a Vietnamese actress. In 2013 she was nominated for the Best Actress Award at the 17th National Film Festival for her performance in Nhin Ra Bien Ca (Looking to the Sea).

References

External links

1969 births
Vietnamese actresses
Living people
People from Tuyên Quang province
21st-century Vietnamese women